Joseba Eskubi (born 1967) is a Spanish artist who lives and works in Bilbao, Spain. He works with soft, amorphic and organic forms with images of decay, and his paintings incorporate surrealism. His work is often a single organic figure, and his works are created with mixed media (oil painting, acrylic, plasticine, photography).

Gallery

References

External links 

 
 Joseba Eskubi's photostream on flickr.com
 Joseba Eskubi at Escape Into Life
 Joseba Eskubi at Saatchi Online
 Joseba Eskubi at Juxtapoz
 Joseba Eskubi at Portfotolio
 http://teorificios.com/arteficios/joseba-eskubi

1967 births
Living people
Spanish contemporary artists
20th-century Spanish painters
21st-century Spanish painters
Date of birth missing (living people)
People from Bilbao
Place of birth missing (living people)